Lahad Datu is the capital of the Lahad Datu District in the Dent Peninsula on Tawau Division of Sabah, Malaysia. Its population was estimated to be around 27,887 in 2010. The town is surrounded by stretches of cocoa and palm oil plantations. It is also an important timber exporting port. The town has an airport for domestic flights.

History 
A settlement is believed to have existed here in the 15th century, as excavations have unearthed Ming dynasty Chinese ceramics. Just east of Lahad Datu is the village of Tunku, a notorious base for pirates and slave traders in the 19th century.

Based on a Jawi manuscript in the Ida'an language dated 1408 A.D, it is believed to be the first site in northern Borneo where Islam was first introduced. The Jawi manuscript gives an account of an Ida'an man named Abdullah in Darvel Bay who embraced Islam.

Foreign militant intrusion 

On 23 September 1985, 15-20 armed foreign pirates from the neighbouring Philippines landed on this town, killing at least 21 people and injuring 11 others.

Another standoff occurred in February 2013 and lasted for over a month between Malaysian authorities and the militants of the self-proclaimed "Royal Security Forces of the Sultanate of Sulu and North Borneo" led by Jamalul Kiram III resulted in a Malaysian victory and creation of the Eastern Sabah Security Command and Eastern Sabah Security Zone.

Economy 

Lahad Datu also has several palm oil refineries. The Palm Oil Industrial Cluster (POIC) is located near Lahad Datu township. POIC owns and operates its own port, POIC Port Lahad Datu and received its first vessel on 1 March 2013. To date, 55 companies have invested in POIC with 11 companies involved in fertilizer (making it the biggest cluster of fertilizer companies). POIC is a wholly state-owned company under the purview of the Ministry of Industrial Development, Sabah. Its Chairman is YB Senator Datuk Donald Mojuntin, and the Acting Chief Executive Officer is Mdm. Lynette Hoo (ADK). POIC was started by Datuk Dr Pang Teck Wai in 2005 and now retired since June 2020.

Transportation 
Lahad Datu is linked to other towns and districts via Federal Route 13, a part of larger Pan-Borneo Highway network in the east coast of Sabah. Works of constructing a new bypass road on Sandakan-Tawau route has been commenced on mid 2016, to relieve the traffic congestion on the town itself. Lahad Datu is served by many different methods of transportation. Taxis, buses and minibuses are abundant and provide connectivity around the town and other districts such as Sandakan and Tawau. Lahad Datu Port is a container port administered by Sabah Port Sdn. Bhd.

First Palm City Centre (FPCC) along Jalan Pantai is a integrated commercial development by Titijaya Land Berhad. It consist of 2-3 storey of retail shoplots, bus terminal and anchor business , Econsave operating in this strategic business address. 1.5km to town, 2km to Lahad Datu Airport and 2.5km to Lahad Datu Hospital.

MASwings, a regional airline and subsidiary of Malaysia Airlines (MAB) provides five direct flights daily to Kota Kinabalu, the state's capital from Lahad Datu Airport.

Climate
Lahad Datu has a tropical rainforest climate (Af) with heavy rainfall year-round.

References 

11. First Palm City Centre (FPCC) 
https://www.google.com/maps/place/First+Palm+City+Centre+-+Phase+1/@5.023475,118.3206178,17z/data=!3m1!4b1!4m5!3m4!1s0x323f9f9623c2e99f:0xb07163197ac4c796!8m2!3d5.023433!4d118.3227583

External links 

Lahad Datu District
Towns in Sabah